is a member of the Japanese Communist Party serving in the House of Representatives. He was elected to this position in 2014.

References

Living people
Japanese communists
Japanese Communist Party politicians
Members of the House of Representatives (Japan)
Year of birth missing (living people)